Magdalena Jaworska-Przychoda (June 3, 1961 - July 26, 1994), more commonly known as Magdalena Jaworska, was the winner of  Miss Polonia 1984.

Information 

Jaworska was born on June 3, 1961, in Warsaw, Poland. Even in elementary school, she was predicted to become a model. While studying at the University of Warsaw, she decided to try out for the 1984 Miss Polonia Qualifiers. She nearly missed the final qualifier after sleeping too late. Prior to the start of Miss Polonia 1984, rumors had circulated that the winner of the competition was already pre-determined which lead to a boycott. The situation was initially resolved, but rigging accusations came up again after Joanna Karska was initially chosen as the winner. The voting process was repeated and this time, Jaworska was declared the winner. Jaworska later claimed that she had no idea how she won. Jaworksa was also awarded the "Miss Publiczności" (Miss Audience) and the "Najmilsza Miss" (Nicest Miss) awards, which Jaworska said she valued more than winning Miss Polonia. Jaworska later showed her displeasure with the situation by becoming the only Miss Polonia winner to never wear the crown on her head, opting to wear it on her finger instead. Jaworska was scheduled to compete in Miss Universe 1984, but asked to go to Miss World 1984 instead. This was due to Miss World being held in Britain, where she had relatives. She made various appearances as Miss Polonia and claimed that she had to ride on the public bus in her full pageant attire. She finished outside of the Top 15 in the competition. She also competed in Miss Europe 1985, but finished outside of the Top 5.

After Miss Europe, she got married and had a child named Michael. She finished her master's thesis in 1988. She became a presenter on the Polish news program, "Teleexpress" and later claimed that representatives from the Miss Polonia organization got her banned from television.

In 1990, she wrote autobiography entitled, "Być albo nie być Miss", describing the behind the scenes happenings of various beauty contests, which caused controversy. The Miss Polonia organization also pushed for the book to be banned from being exported. She then later created a clothing company called, "Miss Top".

Death 

Jaworska was found unconscious inside her home on July 8, 1994. Her hair dryer had fallen into the water while in use and caused her to be electrocuted. She was hospitalized and placed in intensive care. She died on July 26, 1994. The situation went public with concerns that she was murdered, but it was eventually declared to be a death due to an accident.

In 2009, her death was covered on the Polish television series, "Miejsca przeklęte" (Cursed Places)

References

Polish beauty pageant winners
1961 births
1994 deaths
Miss Polonia winners
Miss World 1984 delegates
Living people